Bloomington is a historic home located at Louisa, Louisa County, Virginia. The dwelling evolved into its present form from an original two-room, split-log dwelling dating to about 1790. The main block was built about 1832, and is a two-story, three-bay structure with steeply-pitched gable roof constructed over a raised brick basement. A one-story, gable-roofed addition was attached to the north wall of the main block about 1900. The house is a rare example of
18th-to-early-19th-century English frame construction which found expression in early
Southern Colonial style. Also on the property are a contributing tobacco barn, horse barn, corn crib, and tool shed.

It was listed on the National Register of Historic Places in 2004.

References

Houses on the National Register of Historic Places in Virginia
Colonial architecture in Virginia
Houses completed in 1790
Houses in Louisa County, Virginia
National Register of Historic Places in Louisa County, Virginia
1790 establishments in Virginia